In political science, minoritarianism (or minorityism) is a neologism for a political structure or process in which a minority group of a population has a certain degree of primacy in that entity's decision making. Minoritarianism may be contrasted with majoritarianism, with legislative power being held or controlled by a minority group rather than the majority.

Concept in depth 
Minoritarianism is most often applied disparagingly to processes in which a minority is able to block legislative changes through supermajority threshold requirements. For example, if a two-thirds majority vote in favor is required to enact a new law, a minority of greater than one-third is said to have "minoritarian" powers.

Even in the case where minority control is nominally limited to blocking the majority with veto power (whether as a result of a supermajority requirement or consensus decision-making), this may result in the situation where the minority retains effective control over the group's agenda and the nature of the proposals submitted to the group, as the majority would not propose ideas that they know the minority would veto.

Critics of this use of minoritarianism argue that the ability to block legislation is substantially different from the ability to enact new legislation against the will of the majority, making the analogy to unpopular "dominant minority rule" examples inappropriate.

Minoritarianism is sometimes used to describe rule by a dominant minority such as an ethnic group delineated by religion, language or some other identifying factor. Historical examples included Rhodesia (now called Zimbabwe), and South Africa from 1910 to 1994.

Minoritarianism may also be used to describe some cases where appeasement of minorities by votebank politics is practiced. Examples include, but are not limited to, Indian Muslims and Francophone Canadians.

In small deliberative groups 
Supermajority decision threshold requirements are often found in small deliberative groups where these requirements are sometimes adopted in an attempt to increase protection of varied interests within the group. The requirements may be formally stated or may be unstated (for example, when an organization is described as having a "consensus culture").

A common criticism of consensus decision-making is that it can lead to a situation wherein a minority can block the will of the majority. Consensus advocates argue that this is a good feature—that no action is preferable to one without the consensus support of the group.

Attempts to resolve the dilemma through formal supermajority standards are generally discouraged by parliamentary authorities:
Some people have mistakenly assumed that the higher the vote required to take an action, the greater the protection of the members. Instead the opposite is true. Whenever a vote of more than a majority is required to take an action, control is taken from the majority and given to the minority. ... The higher the vote required, the smaller the minority to which control passes.
—from "The Standard Code of Parliamentary Procedure" by Alice Sturgis

Dominant minority 

A dominant minority, also called elite dominance, is a minority group that has overwhelming political, economic, or cultural dominance in a country, despite representing a small fraction of the overall population (a demographic minority). Dominant minorities are also known as alien elites if they are recent immigrants.

The term is most commonly used to refer to an ethnic group which is defined along racial, national, religious, cultural or tribal lines and that holds a disproportionate amount of power. A notable example is South Africa during the apartheid regime, where White South Africans wielded predominant control of the country although they were never more than 22% of the population. African American-descended nationals in Liberia, Christians in Sierra Leone, Sunni Arabs in Ba'athist Iraq, the Alawite minority in Syria (since 1970 under the rule of the Alawite Assad family), and the Tutsi in Rwanda from 1884 to 1959 have also been cited as 20th-century and early-21st-century examples.

Pseudo-secularism 
In the Indian context, the term pseudo-secularism is used to pejoratively describe policies considered to involve minority appeasement. The Hindus form the majority religious community in India; the term "pseudo-secular" implies that those who claim to be secular are actually not so, but are anti-Hindu or pro-minority. The Hindu nationalist politicians accused of being "communal" use it as a counter-accusation against their critics claiming that the Secularism followed by Congress is faulty or "perverted".

See also 

Client politics
Criticism of democracy
Elitism
Iron law of oligarchy
Liberum veto
Majoritarianism (opposite)
Minority influence
Minority (philosophy)
Minority rights
Oligarchy
Pseudo-secularism
Reverse discrimination
Ruling class
Social privilege
Tyranny of the majority

Notes

References 

Barzilai, Gad. Communities and Law: Politics and Cultures of Legal Identities (Ann Arbor: University of Michigan Press, 2003). 
Gibson, Richard. African Liberation Movements: Contemporary Struggles against White Minority Rule (Institute of Race Relations: Oxford University Press, London, 1972). 
Russell, Margo and Martin. Afrikaners of the Kalahari: White Minority in a Black State ( Cambridge University Press, Cambridge, 1979). 
Johnson, Howard and Watson, Karl (eds.). The white minority in the Caribbean (Wiener Publishing, Princeton, NJ, 1998). , 
Chua, Amy. World on Fire: How Exporting Free Market Democracy Breeds Ethnic Hatred and Global Instability (Doubleday, New York, 2003). 
Haviland, William. Cultural Anthropology. (Vermont: Harcourt Brace Jovanovich College Publishers, 1993). p. 250-252. .

Political theories
Political neologisms
Ethnicity in politics
Minorities
Identity politics
Majority–minority relations
Rule by a subset of population